Pallone di Cristallo (Italian for Crystal Ball) is an annual award given to the player who is adjudged to have been the best of the season in Sanmarinese football.

The winner is chosen by a technical commission, directed by Italian journalist Giorgio Betti.

The award has been assigned since 1997/98 season and is usually presented during a SM TV summer special, Calcio Estate.

Winners 
The full list of past winners:

References 

 
1998 establishments in San Marino
Awards established in 1998
Annual events in San Marino
Sammarinese awards
Association football player non-biographical articles